Srīpur is a Martian impact crater, approximately  in diameter. It is located at -31.1°S, 100.8°W, southeast of the crater Dinorwic and northeast of the crater Tugaske. It is named for Sripur, a town in Bangladesh, and its name was adopted by the International Astronomical Union in 1991.

According to a surface age map of Mars based on US Geological Survey data, the area around Srīpur is from the Noachian epoch, which places the area's age at 3.8 to 3.5 billion years ago. The area south of the crater is about the same elevation as the crater floor.

References 
 

Impact craters on Mars
Thaumasia quadrangle